Green Grass Widows is a 1928 American silent comedy film directed by Alfred Raboch, and produced and released by Tiffany-Stahl Productions. The film was directed by the Alfred Raboch and starred golf player Walter Hagen. The film co-stars Hedda Hopper and Gertrude Olmstead.

Cast
Walter Hagen as himself
Gertrude Olmstead as Betty Worthing
John Harron as Del Roberts
Hedda Hopper as  Mrs. Worthing
Lincoln Stedman as Fat
Ray Hallor as Cliff

Preservation status
Some sources have the film lost. However, a copy is said to be held at the British Film Institute.

References

External links
 
 
 Film still featuring Hedda Hopper, Walter Hagen, Gertrude Olmstead
 Film still Walter Hagen, John Harron

1928 films
1928 comedy films
Silent American comedy films
Tiffany Pictures films
American silent feature films
American black-and-white films
1920s American films
1920s English-language films